Babiana mucronata is a perennial plant species that grows to about  high and annually forms leaves and flowers from an underground corm. It is assigned to the iris family. It has a simple or branched, more or less upright spike of 3-12 dark to pale violet-blue, mirror-symmetrical flowers. Three stamens are curved, crowded near the upper lip, and carry pale violet anthers. Flowers may be found between late July and September.

Description 

It has a simple or branched, more or less upright or outward bending spike of at least 3, but usually 6-12, dark to pale violet-blue, acrid- or metallic smelling or sometimes odourless, mirror-symmetrical flowers. The underground part of the stem is surrounded by a thick, fibrous collar. Each flower is subtended by two bracts that are green except for a dry russet tip. The outer bract is squared-off, blunt or has three teeth. The inner bract is only half as long as the outer or only slightly shorter and split all the way to the base. It splits into six unequal tepals towards the top. Flowers may be found between late July and September.

Differences between the subspecies 

Differences with similar species 
Other species in the section Babiana with blue flowers have stems that are almost entirely underground with the leaves extending beyond the inflorescence. B. lineolata also produces a high inflorescence that is longer that the leaves, but it has narrow, rigid and heavily pleated leaves, floral bracts of  only, and pale blue flowers.

Taxonomy and naming 
This species was first described by Nikolaus Joseph von Jacquin in 1794 and he named it Gladiolus mucronatus. It was based on a specimen that was collected somewhere in South Africa and illustrated by Von Jacquin in part 2, plate 253 of his Icones rariorum plantarum. John Bellenden Ker Gawler in 1802 proposed to use the genus name Babiana for the species of bobbejaantjie. Ker Gawler included Jacquin's species and created the new name Babiana mucronata. In 1959, Gwendoline Joyce Lewis distinguished Babiana mucronata var. longituba, a form with a longer than average perianth tube. She also distinguished var. minor, that differs by being smaller and having flowers with shorter perianth tubes which are shorter than the leaves, and Babiana klaverensis, that has narrower leaves with a thickened margin. Peter Goldblatt and John Charles Manning in their 2007 revision of the genus, considered var. longituba as synonymous to Babiana mucronata var. mucronata, raised the status of var. minor to subsp. minor, and included B. klaverensis in subsp. minor. 

The species name mucronata is derived from the Latin word mucro, which is a reference to the pointed, often sharp extension of the mid vein that extends beyond the abruptly terminating leaf.

Distribution, ecology and conservation 
Olifantsbobbejaantjie can be found in the Western Cape province of South Africa, between Tulbagh and Piketberg in the south and the Pakhuis Pass and the Olifants River Mountains in the north. Here it grows on rocky outcrops, stony clay and sandstone rubble on slopes and flats. The continued survival of Babiana mucronata subsp. mucronata is considered to be of least concern. Babiana mucronata subsp. minor grows on sandy soils in vegetation types known as Nardouw Sandstone Fynbos and Bokkeveld Sandstone Fynbos, on the Gifberg and its slopes and the Bokkeveld Mountains, where it is only known from five locations, which are vulnerable to development for rooibos cultivation, and it is therefore considered endangered.

References 

mucronata
Endemic flora of South Africa
Plants described in 1794